Vladimír Labant (born 8 June 1974) is a Slovak former professional footballer who played as a left-back. He represented the Slovakia national team.

Club career 
Labant was a much sought after left-back after a successful spell with Czech club Slavia Prague. He joined rivals Sparta Prague in 1999 and was touted around Europe to several teams including PSV Eindhoven of the Netherlands. He eventually moved to West Ham United for a fee just under £1 million in January 2002. He made his debut when he came on as a substitute in an FA Cup tie against Chelsea. His cross led to West Ham's equaliser from Freddie Kanoute. He ended the 2001-02 season with 14 first team appearances for West Ham.

The following season he was shunned even as the club fell into a relegation battle. Having made just one appearance for West Ham in the 2002-03 season thus far, in a 4–0 loss at Newcastle United, he rejoined Sparta Prague on loan in December 2002, and eventually re-signed with them permanently the following summer.

Labant finished his playing career with Spartak Trnava in the Slovak Corgoň Liga.

International career 
Labant made 27 appearances for the senior Slovakia national team. He made his debut against Romania in a UEFA Euro 2000 qualifier on 27 March 1999, a match in which he was sent off after receiving two yellow cards. Labant's final cap came against Austria on 31 March 2004.

Honours
Slavia Prague
Czech Cup: 1998–99

Sparta Prague
Czech First League: 1999–2000,  2000–01,  2002–03

Individual
Slovak Footballer of the Year: 1999

References 

1974 births
Living people
People from Čadca
Sportspeople from the Žilina Region
Slovak footballers
Association football defenders
Slovakia international footballers
Slovak Super Liga players
Czech First League players
Premier League players
Austrian Football Bundesliga players
MŠK Žilina players
FK Dukla Banská Bystrica players
FC VSS Košice players
SK Slavia Prague players
AC Sparta Prague players
West Ham United F.C. players
FC Admira Wacker Mödling players
SK Rapid Wien players
FC Spartak Trnava players
Slovak expatriate footballers
Slovak expatriate sportspeople in the Czech Republic
Expatriate footballers in the Czech Republic
Slovak expatriate sportspeople in England
Expatriate footballers in England
Slovak expatriate sportspeople in Austria
Expatriate footballers in Austria